Arada is a municipality in the Honduran department of Santa Bárbara.

Demographics
At the time of the 2013 Honduras census, Arada municipality had a population of 9,622. Of these, 83.87% were Mestizo, 15.76% White, 0.20% Indigenous, 0.12% Black or Afro-Honduran and 0.05% others.

References

External links
 Honduran government information page

Municipalities of the Santa Bárbara Department, Honduras